Styrene acrylonitrile resin is a copolymer plastic consisting of styrene and acrylonitrile. It is also known as SAN. It is widely used in place of polystyrene owing to its greater thermal resistance. The chains of between 70 and 80% by weight styrene and 20 to 30% acrylonitrile. Larger acrylonitrile content improves mechanical properties and chemical resistance, but also adds a yellow tint to the normally transparent plastic.

Properties 
SAN is similar in use to polystyrene. Like polystyrene itself, it is optically transparent and brittle in mechanical behavior.  The copolymer has a glass transition temperature greater than 100 °C owing to the acrylonitrile units in the chain, thus making the material resistant to boiling water.  It is structurally related to ABS plastic, where polybutadiene is copolymerised with SAN to give a much tougher material. The rubber chains form separate phases which are 10-20 micrometers in diameter. When the product is stressed, crazing from the particles helps to increase the strength of the polymer. The method of rubber toughening has been used to strengthen other polymers such as PMMA and nylon.

Uses 

Uses include food containers, water bottles, kitchenware, computer products, packaging material, battery cases and plastic optical fibers.

Health risks 

The acrylonitrile from SAN containers has been found to migrate to content in variable amounts.  Acrylonitrile is classified as a Class 2B carcinogen (possibly carcinogenic) by the International Agency for Research on Cancer (IARC).  Acrylonitrile has been shown to increase rates of cancer appearance in high dosage tests in male and female rats and mice.

References

Plastics
Household chemicals
Packaging materials
Copolymers